Ahmad Alikaj (born 5 June 1991) is a Syrian judoka who competes in the under 73 kg category.

Alikaj is now living and training in Germany after moving from Syria to Germany as a refugee in 2015. He was included in the IJF Refugee Team at the 2019 Budapest Grand Prix and participated in the 2019 World Championships in Tokyo. He released a joint statement alongside Sanda Aldass and Muna Dahouk after being selected for the IOC Refugee Olympic Team [EOR] for the 2020 Summer Games in Tokyo. "We have been dreaming of that for years and today we are living our dream. We feel that we have a great responsibility. We will represent our sport, judo, but also the entire refugee community. We are so proud. We hope that millions of refugees across the globe will want to overcome their difficulties, based on what we have achieved."

References

External links
 

1991 births
Living people
Syrian male judoka
Judoka at the 2020 Summer Olympics
Syrian refugees
Refugee Olympic Team at the 2020 Summer Olympics